Sundargarh Lok Sabha constituency is one of the 21 Lok Sabha Constituencies representing Sundergarh district of Odisha state in Eastern India.

Assembly segments
Assembly segments which constitute this parliamentary constituency are:

Members of Lok Sabha

Election Results

2019 Election Result

2014 Election Result
In 2014 election, Bharatiya Janata Party candidate Jual Oram defeated Biju Janata Dal  candidate Dilip Kumar Tirkey by a margin of 18,829 votes.

General Election 2009

References

External links
Sundargarh lok sabha  constituency election 2019 date and schedule

Lok Sabha constituencies in Odisha
Sundergarh district